Fib the Truth, also known as Lie to Me the Truth is a 2021 Russian erotic thriller film directed by Olga Akatieva.

Plot
A couple in love retire away from civilization. They have been together for not so long, but the man is sure he met his only one. The sudden arrival of the younger sister, and then the girl's ex-boyfriend, ruins the romantic idyll. Heroes become hostages of each other's desires and passions. Romance is replaced by passion, and innocent flirting leads to fierce jealousy. More and more dangerous psychological games threaten to lead to a cruel denouement.

Cast
 Darya Melnikova as older sister
 Yevgeny Romantsov as older sister's boyfriend
 Pavel Priluchny as older sister's ex-boyfriend
 Elizaveta Kononova as younger sister
 Alexander Oblasov as police officer
 Grigory Vernik as fellow traveler

Production
The film was shot in a country house in the Moscow Oblast. The house was rented for filming. Filming was completed in November 2020.

References

External links
  (in Russian)
 

2020s erotic thriller films
2021 thriller drama films
Films set in country houses
Films shot in Moscow Oblast
Russian thriller drama films